The Sehol QX is a compact crossover produced by JAC Motors under the Sehol brand. The Sehol QX was briefly called the Sol QX before launch and was renamed after the Sehol brand name was established. It is the first brand new model of the Sehol brand.

For outside China, the car was sold of rebadged JAC JS6.

Overview

The Sehol QX was launched on the Mainland Chinese market during 2021 Auto Shanghai. The internal code of the QX during development phase is S811. It is reported that the Sehol QX, Sol QX at the time is styled by the JAC Design Center in Turin, Italy, and incorporates Chinese style elements into the design. The Sehol QX was said to be built on JAC's new modular platform.

Powertrain
The only available engine is a 1.5-liter turbo engine developing 184 hp and 300 Nm with front-wheel-drive only. Transmission is a six-speed manual gearbox or dual-clutch transmission.

References

External links
Official website

Sehol QX
Compact sport utility vehicles
Crossover sport utility vehicles
Front-wheel-drive vehicles
Cars introduced in 2021